Catherine Mai-Lan Fox (born December 15, 1977) is an American former competition swimmer who won two gold medals at the 1996 Summer Olympics.

She is of Vietnamese and European descent.  Her father, Thomas C. Fox (editor and former publisher of the National Catholic Reporter), worked in Vietnam for International Voluntary Services from 1966 to 1968, where he met Catherine's mother, To Kim Hoa, a social worker in Can Tho who married Fox and moved to the United States in 1972.

Fox grew up in Roeland Park, Kansas, attended high school at Bishop Miege and graduated from Stanford University, majoring in human biology and studio art.

Fox competed at the 1995 Pan American Games and was a member of the gold medal-winning 4×200-meter freestyle relay team.  She made the U.S. Olympic team for the 1996 Summer Olympics in Atlanta as a freestyle swimmer, and was a member of two gold-winning relay teams: the 4×100-meter freestyle (where she swam in the final) and the 4×100-meter medley (where she swam freestyle in a preliminary heat).  Fox won a gold medal in the 4×100-meter freestyle relay, and bronze medals in the 100-meter freestyle and 100-meter backstroke, at the 1997 Pan Pacific Swimming Championships.

At Stanford, Fox was a 21-time All-American in swimming, a nine-time NCAA champion, and set an American record in the 100-yard backstroke in 1999 with a time of 52.47 seconds.

In 2006, she was named to the Kansas Sports Hall of Fame.

See also
 List of Olympic medalists in swimming (women)
 List of Stanford University people

References

External links
 

1977 births
Living people
American female backstroke swimmers
American female freestyle swimmers
American sportswomen
American sportspeople of Vietnamese descent
Bishop Miege High School alumni
Olympic gold medalists for the United States in swimming
Pan American Games gold medalists for the United States
People from Roeland Park, Kansas
Sportspeople of Vietnamese descent
Stanford Cardinal women's swimmers
Swimmers at the 1995 Pan American Games
Swimmers at the 1996 Summer Olympics
Medalists at the 1996 Summer Olympics
Pan American Games medalists in swimming
Medalists at the 1995 Pan American Games